Richard Joseph Cardamone (October 10, 1925 – October 16, 2015) was a United States circuit judge of the United States Court of Appeals for the Second Circuit.

Early life and career

Born in Utica, New York in 1925, Cardamone was in the United States Navy during World War II, from 1943 to 1946, and then received a Bachelor of Arts degree from Harvard University in 1948 and a Bachelor of Laws from Syracuse University College of Law in 1952. He then entered private practice in Utica, until 1962.

Judicial service

In 1962 Cardamone began his judicial career by gaining election to the New York State Supreme Court, serving as a Justice from 1963 to 1981. On October 1, 1981, Cardamone was nominated by President Ronald Reagan to a seat on the United States Court of Appeals for the Second Circuit vacated by Judge William Hughes Mulligan. He was confirmed by the United States Senate on October 29, 1981, and received his commission the same day. Cardamone assumed senior status on November 13, 1993. Cardamone died on October 16, 2015.

Reported Decisions

Cardamone began his opinion in Demoret v. Zegarelli, 451 F.3d 140 (2d Cir. 2006) by noting a defendant's connection to a classic American short story:

Cardamone also wrote the appellate decision affirming the District Court decision by Judge Thomas P. Griesa that invalidated the U.S. Army Corps of Engineers' permit for Westway, a proposed highway on the West Side of Manhattan.

References

External links
 

1925 births
2015 deaths
Politicians from Utica, New York
Harvard University alumni
Judges of the United States Court of Appeals for the Second Circuit
New York Supreme Court Justices
New York (state) lawyers
Syracuse University College of Law alumni
United States court of appeals judges appointed by Ronald Reagan
20th-century American judges
United States Navy personnel of World War II
American people of Italian descent